"Say Nothing" is a song by British singer Example, released on 16 September 2012 in the United Kingdom as the lead single from his fourth studio album The Evolution of Man (2012).  The song was written by Example, Johnny McDaid, and Dirty South, and was produced by the latter alongside Moám. The song features guitar work by Graham Coxon.

"Say Nothing" entered the UK Singles Chart at number 2, held off the top spot by The Script's "Hall of Fame", which spent a second week at number one.

Background and release
"Say Nothing" received its world premiere on 30 July 2012 on the Capital FM Breakfast Show. NME confirmed that the single would feature remixes from Roska, TC, BURNS, Foamo and Hardwell. The interview also stated that "Say Nothing" and "Perfect Replacement" would receive their live debuts in August 2012 at the V Festival.

On 30 July 2012, Example revealed the single artwork via Twitter and confirmed via a comment on Facebook that it features a photo of his younger self, around two years old layered over a photo he took in Austria on an aeroplane. In an interview, he revealed that the original photo won a 'Good Looking Baby' contest in his local paper, and he wanted the single artwork to be different from the popular 'boring' artwork, and just wanted it to look 'cool'.

Critical reception
The single has received mixed reviews. It was criticised for the double negative 'don't speak no more' by Popjustice, but generally getting good reception. Capital FM received many positive tweets from listeners after the world premiere and 4Music expressed their love for it, saying it was 'definitely worth the wait' with a 'humongous guitar riff and big stadium chorus'. Digital Spy rated it four stars, calling it "an electronic anthem that's ready to take over the airwaves" and commenting that it "maintains a sense of depth, proving that despite his questionable celebrity jibes his talent still comes out on top".

Music video
The official video for "Say Nothing" premiered on Example's YouTube channel on 8 August 2012. The video was recorded in Almería, Andalucia, Spain.

Track listing

Credits and personnel
Adapted from the parent album's liner notes.

 Example – songwriter
 Johnny McDaid – songwriter, backing vocals
 Dirty South – songwriter, producer, keyboards and drum programming
 Moám – additional production, keyboards and synthesizers
 Wez Clarke – mixer, additional programming and drums
 Jon Moon – vocal recording
 Graham Coxon – guitars
 Tom Goss – guitars

Charts

Weekly charts

Year-end charts

References

2012 singles
2012 songs
Example (musician) songs
Ministry of Sound singles
Music videos directed by Adam Powell
Songs written by Example (musician)
Songs written by Johnny McDaid